Passing Through is a 1977 American film directed by Larry Clark and co-written by the director and by Ted Lange.

Plot
The film is about an ex-con musician named Eddie Warmack who is trying to re-establish himself as a musician, hoping that an elder in the craft, Poppa Harris, could help him while he evades a predatory music industry controlled by white society. Warmack had received his sentence because he slayed a gang member who was white. The person killed by Warmack had destroyed the eyesight of another musician named Skeeter. There is another character, Maya, who is the romantic partner of the main character.

Warmack attempts to lead a rebellion against the music establishment but is unable to get allies. However an assassin from the said establishment slays Skeeter in response. Maya takes a photograph of the murder. The main character and his allies get revenge by attacking the boss of the musical industry and murdering him and those with him.

Creation
Clark was in the American Film Institute program while he directed the film. Clark chose to stay in the program and continue making films with the AFI facilities, which allowed him to do so more inexpensively. Therefore he did not Passing Through as his capstone film.

During production, Charles Burnett worked as a cameraman while Julie Dash worked as a sound technician; both of them would also complete their studies at UCLA and direct landmark films of their own.

The film’s score, arranged by Horace Tapscott, features music by Eric Dolphy, Charlie Parker, John Coltrane and Sun Ra, as well as a live performance by the Pan African Peoples Arkestra.

Cast
 Nathaniel Taylor - Eddie Warmack
 Pamela Jones - Maya
 Sherryl Thompson - Trixie
 Bob Ogburn - Skeeter

Release

Though it's now considered a landmark of American independent cinema, Passing Through cannot be seen anywhere but a movie theater, and even then only very rarely.

When Clark made a personal appearance at a retrospective of his work at The Museum of Modern Art in 2022, he was asked why Passing Through could only be seen through theatrical exhibitions. Clark indicated he liked keeping it that way so that the film would be seen in the right format and with a communal audience. He also expressed his disappointment in how films often looked on home video formats, and he emphasized he didn't want the film to be compromised in similar fashion. Clark added he was under no commercial pressure to make more money through home distribution as the film had been self-financed.

That same year, Peter Lucas, who established the Houston Museum of Fine Arts program Jazz on Film, reiterated Clark's statements, adding that Passing Through was not likely to get a physical release nor a release on a streaming network.

Screenings for Passing Through typically come from a 16mm print or from a DCP made from a digital preservation courtesy of the UCLA Film & Television Archive.

Reception
According to Jan-Christopher Horak, the reactions were "mixed" in the "mainstream press". Since then, the film's reputation has grown in stature, with Richard Brody of The New Yorker calling it "one of the greatest movies about jazz."

Brody also praised the opening sequence as "a montage of musical creation, featuring multiple exposures of a vigorously modern group seen in mood-rich tones of blue and red; the rapid fingering of a saxophone and the angular athleticism of drumming are superimposed to give visual identity to the music’s rhythms. The sequence fuses documentary and impressionism, recording and transformation, while also crowning its painterly energy with yet another rhythmic red light that’s a part of the jazz life: a rotating one atop a police car."

Jonathan Rosenbaum of The Chicago Reader hailed the film as "original and thoughtful...a very special first feature, with a feeling for the music that’s boldly translated into film style."

Jazz critic Gary Giddins championed the film as "a genuinely innovative drama of Los Angeles musicians, in which Horace Tapscott’s score and recorded excerpts by Charlie Parker, Eric Dolphy and others telegraph the emotions of the characters with a specificity rare in any film...it’s like nothing else you’ve seen." With regards to the music, Giddins wrote that "Clark understands the distinctions between bebop and hard bop, borderline avant-garde and full-body avant-garde jazz. He uses those distinctions to telegraph the mood of the characters and story, combining original music with excerpts from classic jazz recordings."

References

External links
 
1977 films